The Highway is the third studio album from recording artist Holly Williams. Released on February 5, 2013, the album reached No. 1 on the Billboard Heatseekers chart.

Track listing

Personnel
 Sam Ashworth – acoustic guitar, percussion
 Cary Barlowe – acoustic guitar
 Dierks Bentley – duet vocals on "'Til It Runs Dry"
 Bruce Bouton – pedal steel guitar
 Steve Brewster – drums, percussion
 Jackson Browne – duet vocals on "Gone Away from Me"
 Chris Coleman – drums, acoustic guitar, electric guitar, lap steel guitar, mandolin, percussion, background vocals
 Dan Dugmore – lap steel guitar, pedal steel guitar
 Jakob Dylan – duet vocals on "Without You"
 Mark Hill – bass guitar
 Tammy Rogers-King – fiddle
 Doug Lancio – electric guitar
 Andy Leftwich – fiddle
 Ken Lewis – percussion
 Jerry McPherson – acoustic guitar, electric guitar
 Phil Madeira – organ
 Gwyneth Paltrow – harmony vocals on "Waiting on June"
 Charlie Peacock – keyboards, percussion, piano, trumpet, background vocals, Wurlitzer
 Matt Slocum – cello
 Holly Williams – drums, acoustic guitar, electric guitar, piano, lead vocals, background vocals
 Glenn Worf – bass guitar, upright bass

Charts

References 

2013 albums
Holly Williams albums
Albums produced by Charlie Peacock